Sengés is a municipality in the state of Paraná in the Southern Region of Brazil.

The municipality contains part of the  Cerrado State Park, created in 1992.

See also
List of municipalities in Paraná

References